Al-Hasanain Sport Club, is an Iraqi football team based in Sadr City, Baghdad, that plays in the Iraq Division Three.

History

in Premier League
Al-Hasanain played in the Iraqi Premier League for the first time in the 2009–10 season, and finished 13th in Group 2, won 9 matches, drew 11 and lost 14, and was able to continue playing in the Premier League for a second season. In the following season, 2010–11, the team was very bad, as it finished the season second from bottom of the standings in Group 2, after winning only 3 matches, drawing 4 and losing 19, and relegated to the Iraq Division One.

Managerial history
 Ahmed Daham
 Firas Jafar

References

External links
 Al-Hasanain SC on Goalzz.com
 Iraq Clubs- Foundation Dates

Football clubs in Iraq
Sport in Baghdad
1994 establishments in Iraq
Association football clubs established in 1994
Football clubs in Baghdad